"Uchiage Hanabi" (official English is "Fireworks") is a song by Daoko and Kenshi Yonezu released in August 2017. "Uchiage Hanabi" means "launching fireworks". The song is used for the anime film Fireworks and the album Thank You Blue. There are two solo versions, Yonezu's solo version released for Bootleg for minimalist rearrangement, and Daoko's solo version for Shiteki Ryoko. It ranked number one in Billboard Japan Hot Animation for 25 weeks. It won Song of the Year of Space Shower Music Awards in 2018.

Reception 
The song received many positive reviews, and was described as merging the light sadness of summer and floweriness of fireworks, mixing delicate piano and strings with an electro effect and producing a beautiful scene. The music video for the song has garnered over 505 million views on YouTube.

Track listing

Personnel 
Credits adapted from the CD liner notes
 Kenshi Yonezu - music (track 1), lyrics (track 1), producer (track 1) arrangement (track 1), vocals (track 1), 
 DAOKO - vocals (tracks 1-3), composer (track 3), lyrics (track 3) 
 Hayato Tanaka - arrangement (track 1)
 Youhei Makabe - guitar (track 1)
 Masaki Hori - drums (track 1)
 Hiroaki Yokoyama - piano (track 1)
 Koichiro Muroya - strings (track 1)
 Yoshio Arimatsu - drum technician (track 1)
 REMEDIOS - music (track 2), lyrics (track 2)
 Satoru Kosaki - arrangement (track 2)
 Hitoshi Konno - strings (track 2)
 Takato Saijo - horn (track 2)
 Yu Kumai - horn (track 2)
 Hitoshi Watanabe - bass (track 2)
 Masahiro Itami - guitar (track 2)
 Satoru Kosaki - piano (track 2), programming (track 2)
 Yuri Misumi - sound coordinate (track 2)
 Kazuo Sudo - sound coordinate (track 2)
 Keiichi Ejima - arrangement (track 3)
 Masashi Uramoto - recording (track 3), mixing (track 3)
 Keiji Kondo - recording (track 3), ProTools operation (track 3)
 Tetsuro Sawamoto - Assistant
 Masayuki Yoshii - Assistant 
 Ted Jensen - mastering (all tracks)
 Genki Kawamura - executive producer

Charts

Weekly charts

Year-end charts

Certifications

Accolades

References

External links 

2017 singles
Kenshi Yonezu songs
Billboard Japan Hot 100 number-one singles
Songs written for animated films